The Presbyterian Church in Korea (HapDongYeChong) is a Reformed and Presbyterian denomination in South Korea. Under the leadership of Rev. Chun Byung-Hun, Rev. Choi Young-Su and Lee Sang-Yun the denomination was founded in 1988 at Seoul YeChin Church. In 2004 there was 32,178 members in 65 congregations served by 70 ordained ministers the church had 7 Presbyteries and a General assembly. It subscribes the Apostles Creed and Westminster Confession.

References 

Presbyterian denominations in South Korea
Presbyterian denominations in Asia